The Next Chapter may refer to:

  Peter Andre: The Next Chapter, a British reality TV show
 The Next Chapter (album), a 2003 live album/DVD by Mostly Autumn
 The Next Chapter (radio program), a Canadian radio program
 The NeverEnding Story II: The Next Chapter, a 1990 German-American film
 The Next Chapter, a 2014 album by Gita Gutawa
 The Next Chapter, a 2020 EP by Don Amero